The bone morphogenetic protein receptor, type IA also known as BMPR1A is a protein which in humans is encoded by the BMPR1A gene. BMPR1A has also been designated as CD292 (cluster of differentiation 292).

Function 

The bone morphogenetic protein (BMP) receptors are a family of transmembrane serine/threonine kinases that include the type I receptors BMPR1A (this protein) and BMPR1B and the type II receptor BMPR2. These receptors are also closely related to the activin receptors, ACVR1 and ACVR2. The ligands of these receptors are members of the TGF beta superfamily. TGF-betas and activins transduce their signals through the formation of heterodimeric complexes with 2 different types of serine (threonine) kinase receptors: type I receptors of about 50-55 kD and type II receptors of about 70-80 kD. Type II receptors bind ligands in the absence of type I receptors, but they require their respective type I receptors for signaling, whereas type I receptors require their respective type II receptors for ligand binding.

BMP's repress WNT signaling to maintain stable stem cell populations. BMPR1A null mice died at embryonic day 8.0 without mesoderm specification, demonstrating its vital role in gastrulation. It has been demonstrated in experiments using dominant negative BMPR1A chick embryos that BMPR1A plays a role in apoptosis and adipocyte development. Using constitutively active forms of BMPR1A, it has been shown that BMPR1A plays a role in cell differentiation. Signals transduced by the BMPR1A receptor are not essential for osteoblast formation or proliferation; however, BMPR1A is necessary for the extracellular matrix deposition by osteoblasts. In the chick embryo, BMPR1A receptors are found in low levels in limb bud mesenchyme, a differing location to BMPR1B, supporting the differing roles they play in osteogenesis.

Ligands 

 Agonists: BMP2, BMP4, BMP6, BMP7, GDF6
 Antagonists: Noggin, Chordin

Diseases
BMPR1A, SMAD4 and PTEN are responsible for juvenile polyposis syndrome, juvenile intestinal polyposis and Cowden's disease.

Interactions 

BMPR1A has been shown to interact with:
 BMP2,
 SF3B4,  and
 ZMYND11.

References

Further reading

External links 
 GeneReviews/NCBI/NIH/UW entry on Juvenile Polyposis Syndrome
 
 

Clusters of differentiation
Transmembrane receptors
S/T domain
GS domain
Bone morphogenetic protein
EC 2.7.11